Sagurigawa Dam  is a rockfill dam in the Niigata Prefecture, Japan, completed in 1993. It was built in the tributary of the Shinanogawa river, a group of mountains. Its purpose is using the water from the river and to protect from floods.

References 

Dams in Niigata Prefecture
Dams completed in 1993